Petropavlovka (Buryat and , Shivee) is a rural locality (a selo) and the administrative center of Dzhidinsky District of the Republic of Buryatia, Russia. Population:

References

Notes

Sources

Rural localities in Dzhidinsky District